Grinberg is a surname and Yiddish variant of Grünberg, literally "green mountain" in German. Notable people with the surname include:

Adam Greenberg (cinematographer) (born 1939), Polish cinematographer
Alexander Grinberg, Soviet photographer
Anouk Grinberg (born 1963), Belgian actor
Emanuel Grinberg (1911–1982), Latvian mathematician
Grinberg's theorem, named after Emanuel Grinberg
Gedalio Grinberg (1931–2009), Cuban-American watchmaker
Iosif Grinberg (1906–1980), Soviet literary critic
Ivan Grinberg (1908–1973), birth name of Philip Rahv
Jacques Grinberg (1941-2011), neo-expressionist painter and printmaker
Linda Grinberg (1951–2002), American HIV/AIDS activist
Maria Grinberg (1908–1978), Soviet pianist
Ricardo Grinberg (born 1948), Argentine chess master
Sara Topelson de Grinberg (born 1945), Polish-born Mexican architect
Yoysef Grinberg (1900–1996), Polish-born American actor
Zalman Grinberg (1912–1983), American physician
Itai Grinberg (1912–1983), American academic and senior U.S. Treasury official

See also 
Greenberg
Grimberg
Grynberg
Grünberg (disambiguation)

Jewish surnames
Yiddish-language surnames